José Marcelo Vivas (born 8 February 1966) is an Argentine football manager and former player.

Career
Vivas was born in Santa Fe, and was a Newell's Old Boys youth graduate. He made his senior debut while on loan at Tiro Federal in 1984, and also played for Central Córdoba de Rosario before retiring in 1987 due to an ankle and fibula injury.

Immediately after retiring, Vivas returned to Newell's as a youth coach. He subsequently worked under the same role at Estudiantes de La Plata and Central Córdoba before being named manager of the latter's first team in February 2011.

On 10 September 2011, Vivas resigned after his family received threats, and subsequently worked for a short period at Independiente de Bigand and Tiro Federal's youth categories before being named youth coordinator at San Martín de San Juan in February 2012. At the latter side, he was also an interim manager on three occasions.

On 17 June 2014, Vivas returned to Central Córdoba, but resigned on 1 October. He moved to Peru in the following year, after being named manager of Real Garcilaso's youth sides, and was later an assistant of Javier Torrente at Mexican side León.

On 26 June 2018, Vivas was appointed manager of Unión Comercio. He left on a mutual agreement on 5 May of the following year, and took over fellow league team Sport Boys on 9 July.

On 13 September 2020, Vivas resigned from Sport Boys, and was named at the helm of Alianza Atlético the following 25 August.

Personal life
Vivas' younger brother Claudio is also a football manager.

References

External links

1966 births
Living people
Footballers from Santa Fe, Argentina
Argentine footballers
Newell's Old Boys footballers
Tiro Federal footballers
Central Córdoba de Rosario footballers
Argentine football managers
Argentine Primera División managers
Central Córdoba de Rosario managers
San Martín de San Juan managers
Peruvian Primera División managers
Sport Boys managers
Alianza Atlético managers
Argentine expatriate football managers
Argentine expatriate sportspeople in Mexico
Argentine expatriate sportspeople in Peru
Expatriate football managers in Peru
Association footballers not categorized by position
Unión Comercio managers
Ayacucho FC managers